Genyomyrus donnyi is a species of elephantfish in the family Mormyridae being the only member of its genus. It occurs only in the Congo River basin in Middle Africa.

References 

Weakly electric fish
Mormyridae
Fish of Africa
Monotypic ray-finned fish genera
Fish described in 1898